State Flag Square is a square on Victors Avenue in the city of Minsk, the capital of Belarus. It sits between the avenue and the BelExpo Exhibition Center.

Notable events

Inauguration of the Square 
The Square was opened by President Alexander Lukashenko and Lao President Choummaly Sayasone on 2 July 2013, during a ceremony on the square.

Events of state 
 State Flag and Coat of Arms Day celebrations.
 Patriotic events, such as Independence Day.
 Ceremonies for foreign delegations.

Other events 
Many of the demonstrations during the 2020 Belarusian protests took place on the square.

Flag 
The flag is made with special waterproof fabric and weighs .

See also
National Flag Square
List of squares in Minsk

References 

Squares in Minsk
National squares